The VinFast Fadil is an A-segment crossover hatchback produced by VinFast, a member of Vingroup, since 2018. It is a continued-production version of the discontinued Opel Karl Rocks for the Vietnamese car market.

Safety
VinFast Fadil received 4-Star rating with an accumulated score of 69.97 points by ASEAN NCAP in 2019 with detail of 32.61 points for the AOP category, 17.91 points for the COP category and 19.44 points for the SATs

Sales 

The Fadil was the best selling car in Vietnam in 2021.

See also
 Opel Karl
 Chevrolet Spark

References

External link
 
 
 VinFast Fadil's brochure
 VinFast Fadil spare parts
 VinFast Fadil's user guide
 Fadil book

Cars introduced in 2018
Fadil
Hatchbacks
City cars
ASEAN NCAP superminis